The 2009–10 Rain or Shine Elasto Painters season was the fourth season of the franchise in the Philippine Basketball Association (PBA).

Key dates
August 2: The 2009 PBA Draft took place in Fort Bonifacio, Taguig.

Draft picks

Roster

Philippine Cup

Eliminations

Standings

Game log

Eliminations

|- bgcolor="#edbebf" 
| 1
| October 16
| Talk 'N Text
| 76–85
| Cruz, Telan (14)
| Telan (20)
| Norwood (4)
| Araneta Coliseum
| 0–1
|- bgcolor="#edbebf" 
| 2
| October 21
| Sta. Lucia
| 90–95
| Araña (19)
| Norwood (9)
| Tang (5)
| Cuneta Astrodome
| 0–2
|- bgcolor="#edbebf" 
| 3
| October 24
| Burger King
| 89–91
| Araña (25)
| Reyes (14)
| Norwood (6)
| Gingoog, Misamis Oriental
| 0–3
|- bgcolor="#edbebf"
| 4
| October 28
| Barako Bull
| 81–89
| Norwood (17)
| Norwood (7)
| Norwood (5)
| Araneta Coliseum
| 0–4

|- bgcolor="#edbebf" 
| 5
| November 4
| San Miguel
| 77–93
| Norwood, Chan (14)
| Laure (11)
| Tang (5)
| Araneta Coliseum
| 0–5
|- bgcolor="#edbebf" 
| 6
| November 8
| Barangay Ginebra
| 77–86
| Reyes, Cruz (14)
| Reyes (8)
| Mercado (4)
| Araneta Coliseum
| 0–6
|- bgcolor="#bbffbb" 
| 7
| November 13
| Alaska
| 86–81
| Araña (21)
| Reyes (13)
| Norwood (6)
| Ynares Center
| 1–6
|- bgcolor="#edbebf" 
| 8
| November 15
| Purefoods
| 69–103
| Araña (20)
| Reyes (6)
| Norwood (3)
| Araneta Coliseum
| 1–7
|- bgcolor="#edbebf" 
| 9
| November 20
| Smart Gilas*
| 87–96
| 
| 
| 
| Araneta Coliseum
| 
|- bgcolor="#bbffbb" 
| 10
| November 25
| Coca Cola
| 92–84
| Mercado (24)
| Chan, Telan (6)
| Mercado (8)
| Araneta Coliseum
| 2–7

|- bgcolor="#bbffbb" 
| 11
| December 2
| Talk 'N Text
| 95–93
| Araña (20)
| Reyes (12)
| Chan (5)
| Araneta Coliseum
| 3–7
|- bgcolor="#edbebf" 
| 12
| December 6
| Burger King
| 99–101
| Norwood (25)
| Reyes, Araña (8)
| Tang (6)
| Araneta Coliseum
| 3–8
|- bgcolor="#edbebf" 
| 13
| December 12
| Barangay Ginebra
| 97–101
| Norwood (22)
| Cruz (10)
| Norwood (7)
| Tacloban City
| 3–9
|- bgcolor="#edbebf" 
| 14
| December 18
| San Miguel
| 90–104
| Araña (17)
| Reyes (12)
| Mercado (4)
| Araneta Coliseum
| 3–10
|- bgcolor="#bbffbb" 
| 15
| December 23
| Barako Bull
| 88–72
| Mercado (24)
| Chan, Norwood (8)
| Mercado (8)
| Cuneta Astrodome
| 4–10

|- bgcolor="#edbebf" 
| 17
| January 6
| Sta. Lucia
| 91–95
| Norwood (18)
| Norwood, 2 others (8)
| Mercado (8)
| Araneta Coliseum
| 4–11
|- bgcolor="#edbebf" 
| 18
| January 10
| Purefoods
| 88–101
| Norwood (29)
| Norwood (7)
| Mercado (8)
| Araneta Coliseum
| 4–12
|- bgcolor="#edbebf" 
| 19
| January 15
| Coca Cola
| 83–105
| Norwood, 2 others (14)
| Mercado (8)
| Norwood, Mercado (6)
| Araneta Coliseum
| 4–13
|- bgcolor="#edbebf" 
| 16
| January 22
| Alaska
| 94–95
| Mercado (35)
| Cruz (9)
| Mercado, Araña (3)
| Ynares Center
| 4–14

Playoffs

|-  bgcolor="#bbffbb"
| 1
|  January 24
|  Sta. Lucia
|  90–86
|  Mercado (18)
|  Mercado, Chan (7)
|  Araña (5)
|  Ynares Center
|  1–0
|-  bgcolor="#bbffbb"
| 2
|  January 27
|  Coca Cola
|  99–84
|  Mercado (28)
|  Laure (6)
|  Mercado (8)
|  Ynares Center
|  2–0

|-  bgcolor="#edbebf" 
| 1
|  January 29
|  Purefoods
|  85–90
|  Araña (19)
|  Reyes (10)
|  Norwood (6)
|  Araneta Coliseum
|  0–1
|-  bgcolor="#edbebf" 
| 2
|  January 31
|  Purefoods
|  94–95
|  Mercado (26)
|  Norwood (16)
|  Chan (5)
|  Araneta Coliseum
|  0–2
|-  bgcolor="#bbffbb" 
| 3
|  February 3
|  Purefoods
|  95–92
|  Chan (17)
|  Norwood, Cruz (7)
|  Chan (6)
|  Araneta Coliseum
|  1–2
|-  bgcolor="#bbffbb" 
| 4
|  February 5
|  Purefoods
|  103–100
|  Mercado (24)
|  Reyes (12)
|  Mercado (8)
|  Araneta Coliseum
|  2–2
|-  bgcolor="#edbebf" 
| 5
|  February 7
|  Purefoods
|  85–95
|  
|  
|  
|  Araneta Coliseum
|  2–3

Fiesta Conference

Eliminations

Standings

Game log

Transactions

Pre-season

Imports recruited

References

Rain or Shine Elasto Painters seasons
Rain or Shine